Pascucci is a surname. Notable people with it include:

Felipe Pascucci (1907–1966), Italian football manager
Francesco Pascucci (1748 - after 1803), Spanish-Italian painter
Ilaria Pascucci, Italian astrophysicist
Luigi Arbib Pascucci (d. 1942), Italian tank commander
Valentino Pascucci (born 1978), American baseball player
Vito Pascucci (1922–2003), American businessman